The 1918 Bucknell football team was an American football team that represented Bucknell University as an independent during the 1918 college football season. In its first and only season under head coach Edgar Wingard, the team compiled a 6–0 record, shut out five of six opponents, and outscored all opponents by a total of 236 to 7.

Schedule

References

Bucknell
Bucknell Bison football seasons
College football undefeated seasons
Bucknell football